The Stalk is a  science fiction novel by American writers Chris Morris and Janet Morris, published in 1994. It is the third book of their Threshold trilogy.

References

1994 American novels
1994 science fiction novels
Novels by Janet Morris